Marcin Przybyłowicz (born ) is a Polish composer and sound designer. He is mostly known for as the lead composer for The Witcher 3: Wild Hunt and Cyberpunk 2077. He also composed the score to the Polish television historical drama Korona królów.

Works

References

External links
 

 
 

Video game composers
Polish composers
1985 births
Living people
Polish musicians